Andrew Patrick O'Keefe AM (born 1 October 1971) is an Australian former television presenter and lawyer. He is best known for being the host of the game shows Deal or No Deal and The Chase Australia. He was also the co-host of Weekend Sunrise from 2005 to 2017.

Legal career
O'Keefe worked as an intellectual property lawyer with law firm Allens Arthur Robinson.

Television career
O'Keefe first started his television career in 2003 in Channel Seven's show Big Bite. Later the same year he began hosting Deal or No Deal.

In 2005, O'Keefe co-hosted the tri-network tsunami appeal Reach Out for relief efforts around Asia. In the same year, he hosted the short-lived Dragons Den and co-hosted the 47th TV Week Logie Awards.

From 2005 to 2017, O'Keefe co-hosted Weekend Sunrise on Saturday and Sunday mornings with journalist Monique Wright. He also regularly substituted for David Koch on Sunrise. He presented the program for two weeks whilst Koch was on holidays during the summer period of 2013 alongside his former Weekend Sunrise co-host Samantha Armytage.

From 2007 to 2009, O'Keefe hosted the quiz show The Rich List.

On 31 May 2013, O'Keefe commenced playing the role of King Herod in the Australian tour of the Jesus Christ Superstar arena show. However, on 14 June 2013, he was admitted to hospital with a neck injury requiring surgery and was forced to relinquish the role for the rest of the tour. O'Keefe believed the injury was aggravated during a performance of the show.

In 2015, O'Keefe began presenting Seven's new game show, The Chase Australia.

In December 2017, O'Keefe announced his resignation as co-host of Weekend Sunrise after 12 years with the show.

O'Keefe's contract with the Seven Network expired at the end of 2020, and he was replaced by Larry Emdur for The Chase Australia.

Honours
In January 2017, he was appointed a Member of the Order of Australia (AM) for his television and charity work.

Personal life
O'Keefe is one of five children. His father was Barry O'Keefe, a judge of the Supreme Court of New South Wales. He is a nephew of the Australian rock and roll singer Johnny O'Keefe.

He attended Saint Ignatius' College, Riverview, and then studied arts and law at the University of Sydney.

O'Keefe was married and has three children. In 2017, the couple separated; in 2019, they divorced.

Community and charity work 
O'Keefe is a former chairman of the White Ribbon Australia, an organisation dedicated to the prevention of violence against women. He was one of the founding members of the campaign in Australia and was an ambassador from 2004, prior to the organisation's dissolution in 2019.

As a result of his work with the White Ribbon Australia, O'Keefe was appointed to the inaugural National Council for the Prevention of Violence Against Women in May 2008, which drafted the report Time for Action: Australia's National Plan for Reducing Violence Against Women and their Children on behalf of the federal government.

Arrests and criminal charges 
In January 2021, O'Keefe was arrested and charged with domestic violence and common assault against his partner. An interim apprehended violence order was sought against O'Keefe by NSW Police on behalf of his partner. In June 2021, O'Keefe had the charges dismissed as the community magistrate found that he was in a hypomanic bipolar state when the offending occurred. He was ordered to complete an intensive mental health treatment program.

In September 2021, O'Keefe was arrested by police for domestic violence–related offences, including contravening an apprehended violence order and assault.

On 27 January 2022, O'Keefe was arrested after he allegedly grabbed a woman by the throat, pushed her to the ground, and punched and kicked her at his unit in Sydney. He was later refused bail a week after his arrest.

On 11 February 2022, he pleaded guilty to possession of 1.5 grams of marijuana.

On 4 May 2022, O'Keefe was denied bail. The magistrate said "There will be a contempt citation unless he retracts and apologises for his behaviour". On 23 May, O'Keefe appeared in the Supreme Court of New South Wales and was granted bail, with strict conditions that he be sent to a drug and alcohol rehabilitation facility in Swan Bay, north of Sydney, for up to a year. Justice Hulme said O'Keefe had long struggled with mental health issues and that rehabilitation was a "good opportunity" for him. He is scheduled to appear before the Downing Centre Local Court in June 2022 for sentencing after earlier pleading guilty to one charge of possessing 1.6 grams of cannabis.

On 24 November 2022, after months on bail, O’Keefe was arrested again at his Vaucluse home for allegedly breaching his bail conditions.

References

External links
Sunrise profile

1971 births
Living people
Australian game show hosts
Members of the Order of Australia
20th-century Australian lawyers
People from Sydney
Sydney Law School alumni
People educated at Saint Ignatius' College, Riverview